Terang  is a town in the Western District of Victoria, Australia. At the 2001 census, Terang had a population of 1,859. The population of Terang has since risen according to the 2011 Census; the population is now 2,348, of which 1,155 are male and 1,193 are female, with the median age being 44.

History

The semi-nomadic Kirrae Wuurong clans originally inhabited the area between Mount Emu Creek and the Hopkins River, and much of their language was recorded by a Scottish squatter, James Dawson.

The first dwelling in the township area was built in 1840 by Donald McNicol, and consisted of a slab hut on the east bank of Lake Terang. The township was developed in the late 1850s, the post office opening on 1 March 1859.

The railway though the town was opened in 1887. From 1890 it was extended as part of Victoria's south-western line. The Mortlake line once branched from the town, opened in 1893 and closed in 1978. The local railway station is served by V/Line passenger services on the Warrnambool line.

The Terang Magistrates' Court closed on 1 January 1983.

Avenues of trees were later planted and several of these are now under the protection of the National Trust. Other features of Terang include a Heritage Trail walk which points out the historic trees and many of the historic buildings and sights of the town.

Features to see are the historic post office with its clock tower (1903-4), the war memorial, the rose gardens with the band rotunda, and the town's first church (Bible Christian Church c.1863). The Thomson Memorial church is also a significant local structure. There is also an 18-hole golf course at the western entrance to the town.

Lake Terang
Lake Terang was a lake that on its shores the town was built. To the south of the town centre is a large peat bed unique to the region. In 1933, while dry, the peat bed began burning but became a shallow lake by the 1940s.  The lake was drained in the 1960s and the dried out lake floor is now used as a recreation area, for agriculture and as part of the Terang Golf Course.

Lake Keilambete

Lake Keilambete is a maar lake 4 km north of the town. The lake is a circular body 1.8 km in diameter and an average depth of 11 m. The salinity is twice that of seawater.

Sport
The town has an Australian Rules football team, Terang-Mortlake, playing in the Hampden Football League.

Terang has a horse racing club, the Terang & District Racing Club, which schedules around eight race meetings a year including the Terang Cup meeting in October.

Terang Harness Racing Club conducts regular meetings at its racetrack in the town.

Golfers play at the course of the Terang Golf Club on High Street. A course made famous by local professional Brook Salmon.

Education
Terang College is a school, established in 1848 as Terang Primary School. It educates more than 400 students from Prep to Year 12. It has two campuses, one located on the western (Warrnambool) side of the town while the other is located near Cobden Road, on Strong Street. The western campus houses years Prep to Grade 4 while the Cobden Road Campus has Years 5 - 12.

Climate
Terang has a moderate oceanic climate (Cfb) with warm summers, albeit with cool nights, and chilly damp winters.

Notable citizens
 John Robertson Duigan MC, the pioneer aviator who built and flew the first Australian-made aircraft, was born in Terang in 1882.
 Tom Skeyhill, Gallipoli campaign veteran and biographer of Sergeant Alvin York WW1 Medal of Honor recipient, was born in Terang in 1895.
 The Australian immunologist and Nobel laureate Frank Macfarlane Burnet grew up in Terang, whilst his father was a bank manager.
 Author, business advisor and media commentator Bernard Salt was born in Terang and attended Terang High School.
 AFL footballer and Essendon premiership player Chris Heffernan.
 Footscray footballer Dick Wearmouth.
 Collingwood footballer and four-time grand finalist Ronnie Wearmouth. 
 Melbourne footballer Jordie McKenzie. 
 The Standardbred racehorse Gammalite, who was the first Standardbred to win A$1 million in Australia.
 Ten Eyewitness News news presenter Candice Wyatt.
 James MacKinnon, cricketer. 
 Adam Harvey Country music singer.
 Con Chrisoulis, academic and graphic novel biographer of David Bowie and the Smiths, was born in Terang.

See also
 Lake Terang
 Terang railway station

References

External links

 Terang - Corangamite Shire

Towns in Victoria (Australia)
Shire of Corangamite
Western District (Victoria)